In geometry, the demiregular tilings are a set of Euclidean tessellations made from 2 or more regular polygon faces. Different authors have listed different sets of tilings. A more systematic approach looking at symmetry orbits are the 2-uniform tilings of which there are 20. Some of the demiregular ones are actually 3-uniform tilings.

20 2-uniform tilings
Grünbaum and Shephard enumerated the full list of 20 2-uniform tilings in Tilings and Paterns, 1987:

Ghyka's list (1946) 

Ghyka lists 10 of them with 2 or 3 vertex types, calling them semiregular polymorph partitions.

Steinhaus's list (1969) 
Steinhaus gives 5 examples of non-homogeneous tessellations of regular polygons beyond the 11 regular and semiregular ones. (All of them have 2 types of vertices, while one is 3-uniform.)

Critchlow's list (1970)
Critchlow identifies 14 demi-regular tessellations, with 7 being 2-uniform, and 7 being 3-uniform.

He codes letter names for the vertex types, with superscripts to distinguish face orders. He recognizes A, B, C, D, F, and J can't be a part of continuous coverings of the whole plane.

References

 Ghyka, M. The Geometry of Art and Life, (1946), 2nd edition, New York: Dover, 1977.
 Keith Critchlow, Order in Space: A design source book, 1970, pp. 62–67
 pp. 35–43
 Steinhaus, H. Mathematical Snapshots 3rd ed, (1969), Oxford University Press, and (1999) New York: Dover
  p. 65
 
 In Search of Demiregular Tilings, Helmer Aslaksen

External links
 
 n-uniform tilings Brian Galebach

Tessellation
Semiregular tilings